Barry Stuart (4 April 1934 – 27 August 2020) was an Australian sprint canoeist who competed from the late 1950s to the late 1960s. Competing in four Summer Olympics, he earned his best finish of ninth twice (1956: K-1 1000 m, 1964: K-4 1000 m).

References

External links
Sports-reference.com profile

1934 births
2020 deaths
Australian male canoeists
Canoeists at the 1956 Summer Olympics
Canoeists at the 1960 Summer Olympics
Canoeists at the 1964 Summer Olympics
Canoeists at the 1968 Summer Olympics
Olympic canoeists of Australia
20th-century Australian people